Sulzbacheromyces is a genus of basidiolichens in the family Lepidostromataceae (the only family within the fungal order Lepidostromatales). The genus is distinguished from the other genera of Lepidostromataceae (Ertzia and Lepidostroma) by having an entirely crustose thallus and from Multiclavula (Cantharellales) by having a chlorococcoid (instead of coccomyxoid) photobiont. The type species grows on soil in the neotropics.

Species
Sulzbacheromyces bicolor  – China
Sulzbacheromyces caatingae  – Neotropics
Sulzbacheromyces chocoensis  – Colombia
Sulzbacheromyces fossicolus  – Singapore
Sulzbacheromyces miomboensis  – Democratic Republic of Congo
Sulzbacheromyces sinensis  – China
Sulzbacheromyces tutunendo  – Colombia
Sulzbacheromyces yunnanensis  – China

References

Agaricomycetes
Lichen genera
Agaricomycetes genera
Taxa described in 2013
Taxa named by Robert Lücking
Basidiolichens